The Rediu is a right tributary of the river Dobrovăț in Romania. It flows into the Dobrovăț in Codăești. The Rediu and Tăcuta dams are located on this river.

References

Rivers of Romania
Rivers of Iași County
Rivers of Vaslui County